Squeezing Out Sparks is the fourth studio album by English singer-songwriter Graham Parker and his band the Rumour. The album was released in March 1979. Although the Rumour were not credited on the cover, their name was included on the album label.

Critically acclaimed, Squeezing Out Sparks was voted album of the year in The Village Voices year-end Pazz & Jop critics' poll and later ranked number 334 on Rolling Stone magazine's list of the 500 greatest albums of all time.

Background

Whereas Parker's previous albums were notable for their strong soul influences, with many prominent tracks and singles including a horn section, on Squeezing Out Sparks producer Jack Nitzsche favoured a rawer sound. Coincidentally, popular punk band the Clash were undergoing a reverse process, trying to expand their musical arrangements. Therefore, the Rumour's rhythm and blues session players went on to record all the horn parts in the Clash's third and praised record London Calling.

Parker explained the recording process in an interview, saying:

The album was originally written to follow a greater concept about growing up in suburbia. Parker explained, "I was kind of attempting a concept album about the suburbs of England, or at least trying to capture a vague approximation of suburban life. ... I guess I drifted off the mark there for the rest of the record because the concept turned out to be a little confining for a whole album." This is reflected in the lyrics to songs such as "Local Girls" and "Saturday Nite Is Dead".

Music videos were made for "Local Girls" and "Protection", and the tracks "Discovering Japan" and "Passion Is No Ordinary Word" received radio airplay. In addition, "You Can't Be Too Strong", an uncharacteristic somber acoustic guitar ballad, met with controversy over its subject matter and narrative: a man's reflections on his girlfriend's abortion. Summing up the album, Parker stated, "Squeezing Out Sparks didn't have as much roots or swing, and there was no horn section on it. The songs were just great."

Release
Studio versions of "I Want You Back" (a Jackson 5 cover) and "Mercury Poisoning" were originally issued on a 45 rpm 7" single which was included with early copies of the album.

In 1996, Arista Records issued Squeezing Out Sparks + Live Sparks with the original ten tracks followed by live versions of the same songs, in the same order, plus live versions of the two bonus tracks, "I Want You Back (Alive)" and "Mercury Poisoning". Live Sparks had originally been released only as a limited edition, promotional picture disc LP.

Squeezing Out Sparks was reissued in the United Kingdom in 2001 by Mercury Records and Vertigo Records, with the two bonus studio tracks.

Critical reception

Squeezing Out Sparks was well received by contemporary critics. Robert Christgau of The Village Voice called it "[a]n amazing record" in a "A+"-rated review for The Village Voice, adding that "Parker's mood, which has narrowed into existential rage with a circumstantial root, makes for perfect, untamable rock and roll." In Rolling Stone, Greil Marcus wrote that the album "is no landmark", but nonetheless praised it as an ambitious work that depicted "true fear and drama." Squeezing Out Sparks was ranked among the top ten albums of the year for 1979 by NME, with "Protection" ranked among the year's top 50 tracks. Critical reception for the album was capped by its being voted the best album of the year in the 1979 Village Voice Pazz & Jop critics' poll.

The album's critical reputation has grown since its release. Trouser Press called it "his toughest, leanest and most lyrically sophisticated LP", while AllMusic critic Stephen Thomas Erlewine cited it as Parker's "finest album", "a masterful fusion of pub rock classicism, new wave pop, and pure vitriol". In 2003, Rolling Stone placed Squeezing Out Sparks at number 335 on its list of the 500 greatest albums of all time; the list's 2012 edition ranked the album 334th.

Track listing

Personnel
Graham Parker – lead vocals, rhythm guitar
The Rumour
Brinsley Schwarz – guitar, backing vocals
Martin Belmont – rhythm guitar, backing vocals
Bob Andrews – keyboards, backing vocals
Steve Goulding – drums, backing vocals
Andrew Bodnar – bass

Charts

References

Graham Parker albums
1979 albums
Albums produced by Jack Nitzsche
Arista Records albums
Vertigo Records albums